Bøgh or Bogh may refer to:

People 
 Albert Vilhelm Bøgh (1843–1927), Norwegian actor
 Buhe (politician) (1927–2017), Chinese politician also known as Bogh
 Carl Bøgh (1827–1893), Danish painter
 Christen Gran Bøgh (1876–1955), Norwegian jurist and critic
 Erik Bøgh (1822–1899), Danish playwright and songwriter
 Ernst Bøgh (born 1945), Danish motorcycle speedway rider
 Johan Bøgh (1848–1933), Norwegian art historian
 Jon Knud Bøgh Fjeldså (born 1942), Norwegian-Danish ornithologist
 Kurt Bøgh ( 1933–2011), Danish motorcycle speedway rider
 Rasmus Bøgh Wallin (born 1996), Danish cyclist
 Rosilicie Ochoa Bogh (born 1972), American politician
 Tore Bøgh (1924–2017), Norwegian diplomat
 Vilhelm Frimann Christie Bøgh (1817–1888), Norwegian archivist

Places 
 Boqeh, Iran (also known as Bogh'eh)
 Bowmore, Scotland (also known as Bogh Mòr)